Nicolás Rinaldi (born 23 August 1993) is an Argentine football player. His current club is Deportivo Cuenca.

References
 Profile at BDFA 
 

1993 births
Living people
Argentine footballers
Argentine expatriate footballers
Association football midfielders
Rangers de Talca footballers
Ferro Carril Oeste footballers
Club Atlético Sarmiento footballers
Flandria footballers
Club Atlético Alvarado players
Estudiantes de Buenos Aires footballers
Chilean Primera División players
Expatriate footballers in Chile
Argentine expatriate sportspeople in Chile